The 1959 municipal election was held October 14, 1959, to elect a mayor and five aldermen to sit on Edmonton City Council and four trustees to sit on each of the public and separate school boards.  The electorate also decided eleven plebiscite questions.

There were ten aldermen on city council, but five of the positions were already filled: Frederick John Mitchell, George Prudham, Donald Bowen, Ethel Wilson, and Laurette Douglas were all elected to two-year terms in 1958 and were still in office (in fact, Mitchell was in office as mayor, having been appointed four weeks earlier by council to replace William Hawrelak (resigned September 9, 1959), but city bylaws allowed him to resume his aldermanic term once a new mayor was elected).

There were seven trustees on the public school board, but three of the positions were already filled: J. Percy Page, Robert Thorogood, and William Orobko were elected to two-year terms in 1958 and were still in office.  The same was true on the separate board, where Leo Lemieux, Vincent Dantzer, and E D Stack were continuing.

Voter turnout

There were 52357 ballots cast out of 150062 eligible voters, for a voter turnout of 34.9%.

Results

 bold indicates elected
 italics indicate incumbent
 SS indicates representative for Edmonton's South Side, with a minimum South Side representation instituted after the city of Strathcona, south of the North Saskatchewan River, amalgamated into Edmonton on February 1, 1912.

Mayor

Aldermen

Public school trustees

Separate (Catholic) school trustees

Plebiscites
 Plebiscite items required a minimum two-thirds "Yes" majority to bring about action

Fluoridation of Water

Shall fluorides, for the prevention of tooth decay, be added to the City water supply sufficient to bring the fluoride content of City water up to the level of one part fluoride to one million parts of water?
Yes - 27946
No - 22166

Landfill

Shall Council pass a bylaw creating a debenture debt in the sum of $75,000.00 for the purchase of land to be used as a refuse disposal area employing the sanitary fill method?
Yes - 20803
No - 8925

Traffic Lights

Shall Council pass a bylaw creating a debenture debt in the sum of $160,000.00 in order to purchase and locate traffic lights on certain highway intersections within the City?
Yes - 22886
No - 7128

Paving

Shall Council pass a bylaw creating a debenture debt in the sum of $250,000.00 for the City share of standard paving of arterial and residential streets?
Yes - 24502
No - 5528

Parks

Shall Council pass a bylaw creating a debenture debt in the sum of $750,000.00 for constructing or improving park areas or playgrounds and circles, buffer zones, ravine side boulevards, small parks and triangles?
Yes - 21718
No - 8154

Railway Underpass

Shall Council pass a bylaw creating a debenture debt in the sum of $300,00.00 for the City share of constructing an underpass of the Canadian National Railway tracks at the crossing of 127 Street at 126 Avenue?
Yes - 21420
No - 9218

Bridge over Mill Creek Ravine

Shall Council pass a bylaw creating a debenture debt in the sum of $500,000.00 for the City share of constructing a four lane bridge to replace the existing structure over Mill Creek Ravine at 82nd Avenue?
Yes - 23490
No - 6729

Royal Alexandra Hospital Expansion

Shall Council pass a bylaw creating a debenture debt in the sum of $3,000,000.00 so that the patient bed capacity of the new Royal Alexandra Hospital approved in 1958 may be increased by 300 beds and to buy equipment?
Yes - 25018
No - 5911

Swimming Pool

Shall Council pass a bylaw creating a debenture debt in the sum of $350,000.00 for the City share of constructing an indoor swimming Pool at Eastglen Composite High School situated at 114th Avenue and 68th Street?
Yes - 13842
No - 15577

Youth Shelter

Shall Council pass a bylaw creating a debenture debt in the sum of $175,000.00 for the purpose of constructing an Emergency Receiving Home for neglected children?
Yes - 25703
No - 4802

Bridges over MacKinnon and MacKenzie ravines

Shall Council pass a bylaw creating a debenture debt in the sum of $1,000,000.00 for the purpose of constructing two 4 lane bridges to replace the existing structures located at 142 Street and MacKinnon Ravine, and 142 Street and MacKenzie Ravine?
Yes - 16743
No - 12645

References

City of Edmonton: Edmonton Elections

1959
1959 elections in Canada
1959 in Alberta